San Nicandro Garganico known until 1999 as Sannicandro Garganico) is a small city and comune in the province of Foggia in the Apulia region of southeast Italy.

This city is part of the Gargano National Park

The comune is bordered by those of Apricena, Cagnano Varano, Lesina, Poggio Imperiale and San Marco in Lamis.

In 1945, about 30 Italian members of a tiny Sabbatarian sect converted to Judaism. Most of the gerim emigrated to Israel and reside mainly in the cities of Birya and Safed, although some remain in San Nicandro Garganico today.

It's a commercial city but, especially in the summer period, very tourist.

Main sights
The 16th century collegiate church, often incorrectly called "Cathedral"
Church of San Giorgio in Terravecchia
Aragonese-Norman Castle
Remains of the Roman villa at Sant'Annea
 Torre Mileto (Mileto Tower) with the sea
 Dolina Carsica Pozzatina (The biggest dolinin in Europe and, perhaps, in the world)

Notes and references

External links

Cities and towns in Apulia
Italian Jewish communities